The Montreal English Theatre Awards (also known as the META awards) are one of the most prestigious awards in the Montreal English theatre industry. The formal awards ceremony takes place annually in Montreal, Quebec, Canada.

History 
The Montreal English Theatre Awards were created in 2012, with support from the Quebec Drama Federation, its founding partner. The META awards were created to recognize work in Montreal's English theatre industry and promote emerging theatre artists and companies in Montreal. The first META ceremony was held in Montreal, in 2013.

Statuette 
The current META awards statuette awarded to individuals of winning categories is a hollow and tall, matte black cylinder, with the letters META engraved on the front, with a red interior. This specific statuette is the one awarded to the winners of each category, since 2014. Previously, in 2013, the statuette awarded had the same overall appearance, excluding the black exterior, which was replaced with a false gold exterior.

Categories

Annual Categories 

 Outstanding Lead Performance – Actor
 Outstanding Lead Performance – Actress
 Outstanding Supporting Performance – Actor
 Outstanding Supporting Performance – Actress
 Outstanding Ensemble
 Outstanding Direction
 Outstanding Set Design
 Outstanding Costume Design
 Outstanding Lighting Design
 Outstanding Sound Design / Composition
 Outstanding Contribution to Theatre
 Outstanding Independent Production
 Outstanding PACT Production
 Outstanding Emerging Artist(s) – Performance
 Outstanding Emerging Artist(s) – Production
 Writing
 Outstanding New Text (Original or Adaptation)
 Outstanding New Translation
 Community
 Outstanding Community Production

Special Awards 
Special awards are decided exclusively to that year, by the META committee, highlighting the elements they feel deserve recognition.

References

External links 
Montreal English Theatre Awards - Official Website

Award ceremonies
Canadian theatre awards
Theatre acting awards
Acting awards